Cecil Charles Hudson Moriarty,   (1877–1958) was an Irish-born British police officer and Irish rugby international.  He won one cap against Wales in 1899. He served as Chief Constable of the Birmingham City Police from 1935 to 1941, and his manuals and books on police procedures became essential guidebooks for police in the United Kingdom.

Born on 28 January 1877 in Tralee, County Kerry, Moriarty was the second son of The Rev. Thomas Alexander Moriarty, a Church of Ireland Rector of Millstreet, County Cork. Moriarty graduated from Trinity College, Dublin in 1898, the year before his cap for the Irish rugby union team. He graduated in 1912 with a bachelor of laws and in 1932 received an additional degree of doctor of laws.

Moriarty then joined the Royal Irish Constabulary, becoming a first-class district inspector in 1902. In 1912, he joined RIC headquarters. In 1918, he moved to Birmingham to take on the role of assistant chief constable. Many Irish constables had been recruited to move to Birmingham by Sir Charles Rafter, Chief Constable of Birmingham from 1899 to 1935, who relied on the Irish to help stamp out the infamous Peaky Blinders gang.

The British police strikes in 1918 and 1919 led to the Police Act 1919, which made it illegal for police officers in the UK to strike. Moriarty realised more professionalism was required among police recruits and officers, and subsequently "became the key figure in organising an intensive training curriculum" in Birmingham. The programme gained a national reputation for police training, and over the next two decades, officers from 77 police forces from England and Wales had trained in Birmingham.

Moriarty wrote several books and papers on police procedures, notably Moriarty's Police Law (1929), which for more than half a century was a fundamental resource for law enforcement officials in the UK.

Moriarty succeeded Rafter as Chief Constable of Birmingham in 1935, and retired six years later, having led the city through two years of the Blitz.

He was made an Officer of the Order of the British Empire (OBE) in the 1925 Birthday Honours. In 1936, he was made a Commander of the Venerable Order of Saint John (CStJ) and in the 1938 New Year Honours, a Commander of the Order of the British Empire (CBE).

Personal life
Moriarty married Muriel Una (née Carter) of Belmullet, County Mayo, in 1906. They had three daughters. He died in 1958 in Worcestershire.

Publications
Moriarty's Police Law (originally Police law: an arrangement of law and regulations for the use of police officers) (1929)
Police Procedure and Administration (1930)
Moriarty's Questions and Answers on Police Subjects (1954)

References

External links
Cecil Moriarty at Scrum.com

1877 births
1958 deaths
Irish rugby union players
Ireland international rugby union players
Monkstown Football Club players
Commanders of the Order of St John
Commanders of the Order of the British Empire
Officers of the Order of the British Empire
British Chief Constables
People from Tralee
Royal Irish Constabulary officers
Birmingham City Police
Rugby union players from County Kerry
Rugby union forwards